Southern Theater Command Ground Force is the Chinese ground force under the Southern Theater Command. Its headquarters is in Nanning, Guangxi.

History 
The Southern Theater Command Ground Force was officially established on 31 December 2015 with the troops of former Guangzhou Military Region and Nanjing Military Region.

Functional department 
 General Staff
 Political Work Department
 Logistics Department
 Equipment department
 Disciplinary Inspection Committee

Direct units

Direct troops

Group army 
 74th Group Army (stations in Huizhou, Guangdong)
 75th Group Army (stations in Kunming, Yunnan)

Other army 
 Second Brigade of Reconnaissance Intelligence
 Second Brigade of Information Support
 Second Brigade of Electronic Warfare
 Second Brigade of Long Range Rocket Artillery
 311st Brigade of Coastal Defense Force (stations in Zhuhai, Guangdong)
 312nd Brigade of Coastal Defense Force (stations in Danzhou, Hainan)
 313rd Brigade of Coastal Defense Force (stations in Pingxiang, Guangxi)
 314th Brigade of Coastal Defense Force (stations in Honghe Hani and Yi Autonomous Prefecture, Yunan)
 315th Brigade of Coastal Defense Force (stations in Xishuangbanna Dai Autonomous Prefecture, Yunnan)
 316th Brigade of Coastal Defense Force (stations in Lincang, Yunnan)
 317th Brigade of Coastal Defense Force (stations in Dehong Dai and Jingpo Autonomous Prefecture, Yunnan)

List of leaders

Commanders

Political commissars

Chief of staffs

References 

Southern Theater Command
Guangzhou Military Region
Chengdu Military Region
Military units and formations established in 2015
2015 establishments in China